The Poecilopsettidae are a family of flatfish in the order Pleuronectiformes, comprising three genera and 21 species. Diets consist of zoobenthos.

In some traditional  classifications, the group was recognisied as subfamily Poecilopsettinae in the family Pleuronectidae.

Genera

 Marleyella
 Nematops
 Poecilopsetta

References

Pleuronectidae
Fish subfamilies